Blepharodes parumspinosus is a species of mantis in the genus Blepharodes in the order Mantodea.

See also
List of mantis genera and species

References

parumspinosus
Insects described in 1930